Inpui Naga may refer to:
 Inpui Naga people 
 Inpui Naga language